Prayas Residential School Bilaspur  (since 2015) is a school for tribal students in Bilaspur, Chhattisgarh, India. This school is completely free for tribal areas students. Prayas School is part of Foundation Prayas. Chief Minister's instructions started: The Chief Secretary gave the guidance given to children in Prayas Residential School

History
 Bilaspur: Students of Residential Schools heard "Raman Ke Gote": Inspiration for Environment and Water Conservation- 12-06-2016
 Prayas School has attained greater success than our expectations: Dr Raman Singh

Faculty
 Free Hostel Faculty 
 Compitative Exam Free Coaching for all students,
 Special Education Faculty for All Subjects.
 Many more facilities available.

The Chhattisgarh government's efforts under the Chief Minister's Child Protection Scheme for the students of Naxal-affected districts of the state are entrusted in the Eleventh and Twelfth grade classes, and they have been provided with PMT, PET in these schools. And J.E.E. Free coaching is also being provided for competitive examinations like. Initiative, residential schools are being run in all the five divisional headquarters including Rajpura Raipur. Under the leadership of Chief Minister Dr. Raman Singh, the future of students belonging to Scheduled Tribes, Scheduled Castes and Backward Classes is being ensured.
'Prayas schools facilitating quality education for all'

At the inaugural function of the digital class room, the chief Minister said that the 12th standard students of Prayas school have presented excellent performance in the JEE and Chhattisgarh PMT and PET also. They have the caliber to be admitted to the Indian Administrative Services also, he added.

References
 Invitation of "Expression of Interest" from the coaching institutes registered for arranging the faculty for teaching work in the residential school, Balvad and Balika, in the year 2017-18.
  Bilaspur: "dreams" will come true The Prayas Bilaspur
 Raipur: In the School of Attempt, the future of Naxal violence children

Education in Bilaspur, Chhattisgarh
Schools in Madhya Pradesh